Robert Smith Walker (born December 23, 1942) is a former American politician who represented Pennsylvania in the United States House of Representatives as a Republican from 1977 until his retirement in 1997. He was known for his fiery rhetoric and knowledge of parliamentary procedure.

Life and career
Born in Bradford, Pennsylvania, Walker graduated from Penn Manor High School. He attended the College of William and Mary from 1960 to 1961 and received his B.S. from Millersville University of Pennsylvania in 1964. Walker taught high school from 1964 to 1967. He took his M.A. from the University of Delaware in 1968 and served in the Pennsylvania National Guard from 1967 to 1973.

Walker became an assistant to Pennsylvania congressman Edwin Duing Eshleman, working for him from 1967 to Eshleman's retirement in 1977. Walker won the Republican nomination to succeed Eshleman from the 16th District, including all or part of Lebanon, Lancaster, and Chester counties.

In Congress, Walker was an outspoken conservative and allied himself with fellow conservatives Newt Gingrich, Bob Dornan and Trent Lott and the Conservative Opportunity Society. He was one of the speakers at the first Pennsylvania Leadership Conference in 1989. Michael Barone and Grant Ujifusa wrote that Walker was "scrappy, good humored, and ready to push his principles forward even at the cost of being mocked." He was a hawk on deficit spending and worked to reduce government spending but at the same time served on the science committee and advocated more spending on the space program, weather research, hydrogen research, and earthquake programs as well as pushing for a cabinet-level department of science.

Walker was also responsible for a rare punishment of the Speaker of the House and aiding in the rise of Gingrich. When C-SPAN began televising the House, Walker, Gingrich, and other conservatives found they could reach a national audience with special order speeches, given at the end of the day after the House finished its legislative program. In these speeches, they assailed the Democrats and their leadership in the House. On May 10, 1984, Walker was speaking to an empty chamber and Speaker Tip O'Neill  had the cameras pan the nearly empty chamber.  No notice of this change was given to the Republicans when it was implemented on May 14, 1984. When the Republicans found out what was going on, Walker, who was speaking when the panning began, and Bob Michel, the Republican leader, angrily complained on the floor. The next day, Gingrich was speaking and Speaker O'Neill lost his cool, resulting in O'Neill's words being taken down and ruled out of order. No Speaker had been so punished since 1795. These events made Gingrich a household name. Gingrich would later bring Walker into the Republican leadership; Walker was chief deputy whip.

Walker was a fierce advocate of stronger drug laws. He proposed that all federal contractors institute programs among their employees with violations to result in the forfeiture of federal contracts – even if as little as one joint were found in a contractor's workplace. Walker also led a campaign against the rewriting of the Congressional Record and had the practice banned in the 104th Congress when Republicans won control of the House. He was chairman of the House Science Committee during his last term.

Congressional Quarterly wrote that "he has raised too many hackles and rubbed too many nerves to be very popular" in the House, but the voters back in Pennsylvania only once gave him less than sixty-five percent of the vote.

In 2001 he was appointed by President George W. Bush to chair the Commission on the Future of the United States Aerospace Industry. He also served on the President's Commission on Implementation of the United States Space Exploration Policy (2004) and the President's Commission on the United States Postal Service (2005).

His name had been circulated as a possible NASA administrator following the 2004 resignation of Sean O'Keefe. He is now on the board of directors of Space Adventures, and has served as chairman of the board of the Space Foundation. He is chairman of the Hydrogen and Fuel Cell Technical Advisory Committee of the U.S. Department of Energy. In October 2016 he was appointed space policy adviser of Donald Trump's presidential campaign.

Walker is executive chairman of the Washington lobbying firm, Wexler & Walker Public Policy Associates. 

Walker is a member of the ReFormers Caucus of Issue One.

References

Michael Barone and Grant Ujifusa. The Almanac of American Politics, 1994. Washington, D.C.: National Journal, 1993. 
Congressional Quarterly. Politics in America, 1992: The 102nd Congress. Washington, D.C.: CQ Press, 1991. 
United States. Congress. Joint Committee on Printing. 1987–1988 Official Congressional Directory, 100th Congress. Duncan Nystrom, editor. Washington, D.C.: United States Government Printing Office, 1987.
United States. Congress. Joint Committee on Printing. 1991–1992 Official Congressional Directory, 102d Congress. Duncan Nystrom, editor. S. Pub. 102–4. Washington, D.C.: United States Government Printing Office, 1991.

External links

 
The Political Graveyard
Interview with Former Congressman Robert Walker, Science Committee Chair, Part I
Marketing Your Science? Keep it Real: An Interview with Congressman Robert Walker, Part II

|-

|-

|-

|-

1942 births
Living people
College of William & Mary alumni
People from Bradford, Pennsylvania
Millersville University of Pennsylvania alumni
Republican Party members of the United States House of Representatives from Pennsylvania
United States congressional aides
University of Delaware alumni
Members of Congress who became lobbyists